Hyung-ki Joo is a Korean-British pianist, composer, comedian and one half of the comedy-musical duo Igudesman & Joo. Billy Joel chose Joo to arrange and record his classical piano pieces for the album Fantasies & Delusions. It was recorded in the Mozart Hall of the  Vienna Konzerthaus, and reached the No. 1 spot on the  Billboard album chart for 18 weeks.

Biography
Born in England of South Korean parents, Joo began his formal training in the UK at the Yehudi Menuhin School with Peter Norris and Seta Tanyel and later earned his Bachelor and Master of Music degrees from Manhattan School of Music, where he studied with Nina Svetlanova. Other teachers include Richard Goode and Oleg Maisenberg.

Yehudi Menuhin himself had chosen Joo to perform as a soloist for his eightieth birthday concert at the Barbican Hall, London.

As a soloist, he has performed with conductors such as Sergiu Comissiona, Andrey Andreev, Rumon Gamba, Daniel Raiskin, and Yehudi Menuhin. In 2001, he founded a piano trio called Dimension, with Rafal Payne and Thomas Carroll.

He has also created and performed several shows which integrate comedy with classical music. His show, A Little Nightmare Music, co-created with Aleksey Igudesman, has been performed all over the world since its world premiere at the Vienna Musikverein.

He is one of the early team members of the Music Traveler GmbH. Music Traveler has several notable musicians as ambassadors; Billy Joel, Hans Zimmer, John Malkovich, Sean Lennon, and Adrien Brody are their chief ambassadors.

References

External links
 Hyung-ki Joo Website
 Hyung-ki Joo and Aleksey Igudesman Website
 Splitting Sides with Comedic Sensation Hyung-Ki Joo
 

1973 births
Living people
English people of South Korean descent
English classical composers
English comedians
English classical pianists
People educated at Yehudi Menuhin School
Manhattan School of Music alumni
21st-century classical pianists